The 1959 Fresno State Bulldogs baseball team represented Fresno State College in the 1959 NCAA University Division baseball season. The Bulldogs played their home games at John Euless Ballpark. The team was coached by Pete Beiden in his 12th year as head coach at Fresno State.

The Bulldogs won the District VIII playoff to advance to the College World Series, where they were defeated by the Oklahoma State Cowboys.

Roster

Schedule

|-
! style="" | Regular Season
|-

|-
! bgcolor="#DDDDFF" width="3%" | #
! bgcolor="#DDDDFF" width="7%" | Date
! bgcolor="#DDDDFF" width="14%" | Opponent
! bgcolor="#DDDDFF" width="25%" | Site/Stadium
! bgcolor="#DDDDFF" width="5%" | Score
! bgcolor="#DDDDFF" width="5%" | Overall Record
! bgcolor="#DDDDFF" width="5%" | CCAA Record
|- align="center" bgcolor="#ffcccc"
| 1 || February 28 || at  || Edwards Field • Berkeley, California || 1–2 || 0–1 || –
|-

|-
! bgcolor="#DDDDFF" width="3%" | #
! bgcolor="#DDDDFF" width="7%" | Date
! bgcolor="#DDDDFF" width="14%" | Opponent
! bgcolor="#DDDDFF" width="25%" | Site/Stadium
! bgcolor="#DDDDFF" width="5%" | Score
! bgcolor="#DDDDFF" width="5%" | Overall Record
! bgcolor="#DDDDFF" width="5%" | CCAA Record
|- align="center" bgcolor="#ccffcc"
| 2 || March 6 || at Camp Pendleton || Unknown • Oceanside, California || 4–0 || 1–1 || –
|- align="center" bgcolor="#ccffcc"
| 3 || March 7 || at Camp Pendleton || Unknown • Oceanside, California || 1–0 || 2–1 || –
|- align="center" bgcolor="#ccffcc"
| 4 || March 7 || at Camp Pendleton || Unknown • Oceanside, California || 13–0 || 3–1 || –
|- align="center" bgcolor="#ccffcc"
| 5 || March 13 || California || John Euless Ballpark • Fresno, California || 4–2 || 4–1 || –
|- align="center" bgcolor="#ccffcc"
| 6 || March 14 || California || John Euless Ballpark • Fresno, California || 10–8 || 5–1 || –
|- align="center" bgcolor="#ffcccc"
| 7 || March 16 ||  || John Euless Ballpark • Fresno, California || 1–4 || 5–2 || –
|- align="center" bgcolor="#ccffcc"
| 8 || March 16 || San Jose State || John Euless Ballpark • Fresno, California || 9–8 || 6–2 || –
|- align="center" bgcolor="#ccffcc"
| 9 || March 20 ||  || John Euless Ballpark • Fresno, California || 8–0 || 7–2 || –
|- align="center" bgcolor="#ffcccc"
| 10 || March 21 || UCLA || John Euless Ballpark • Fresno, California || 9–10 || 7–3 || –
|- align="center" bgcolor="#ffcccc"
| 11 || March 23 || vs  || Unknown • San Diego, California || 2–6 || 7–4 || –
|- align="center" bgcolor="#ccffcc"
| 12 || March 24 || vs  || Unknown • San Diego, California || 7–0 || 8–4 || –
|- align="center" bgcolor="#ccffcc"
| 13 || March 25 || vs  || Unknown • San Diego, California || 2–1 || 9–4 || –
|- align="center" bgcolor="#ccffcc"
| 14 || March 25 || vs San Diego Marines || Unknown • San Diego, California || 12–8 || 10–4 || –
|- align="center" bgcolor="#ccffcc"
| 15 || March 26 || vs  || Unknown • San Diego, California || 10–9 || 11–4 || –
|- align="center" bgcolor="#ccffcc"
| 16 || March 26 || vs San Diego State || Unknown • San Diego, California || 10–6 || 12–4 || –
|- align="center" bgcolor="#ccffcc"
| 17 || March 27 ||  || John Euless Ballpark • Fresno, California || 10–7 || 13–4 || –
|- align="center" bgcolor="#ccffcc"
| 18 || March 28 || Oregon || John Euless Ballpark • Fresno, California || 3–2 || 14–4 || –
|- align="center" bgcolor="#ccffcc"
| 19 || March 31 || at  || Hornet Field • Sacramento, California || 10–7 || 15–4 || –
|- align="center" bgcolor="#ccffcc"
| 20 || March 31 || at Sacramento State || Hornet Field • Sacramento, California || 9–0 || 16–4 || –
|-

|-
! bgcolor="#DDDDFF" width="3%" | #
! bgcolor="#DDDDFF" width="7%" | Date
! bgcolor="#DDDDFF" width="14%" | Opponent
! bgcolor="#DDDDFF" width="25%" | Site/Stadium
! bgcolor="#DDDDFF" width="5%" | Score
! bgcolor="#DDDDFF" width="5%" | Overall Record
! bgcolor="#DDDDFF" width="5%" | CCAA Record
|- align="center" bgcolor="#ffcccc"
| 21 || April 3 || San Diego State || John Euless Ballpark • Fresno, California || 3–5 || 16–5 || 0–1
|- align="center" bgcolor="#ccffcc"
| 22 || April 4 ||  || John Euless Ballpark • Fresno, California || 2–0 || 17–5 || 1–1
|- align="center" bgcolor="#ccffcc"
| 23 || April 4 || Long Beach State || John Euless Ballpark • Fresno, California || 9–3 || 18–5 || 2–1
|- align="center" bgcolor="#ccffcc"
| 24 || April 8 || Camp Pendleton || John Euless Ballpark • Fresno, California || 10–9 || 19–5 || 2–1
|- align="center" bgcolor="#ffcccc"
| 25 || April 8 || Camp Pendleton || John Euless Ballpark • Fresno, California || 3–4 || 19–6 || 2–1
|- align="center" bgcolor="#ccffcc"
| 26 || April 10 || at Long Beach State || Whaley Park • Long Beach, California || 14–4 || 20–6 || 3–1
|- align="center" bgcolor="#ccffcc"
| 27 || April 11 || at San Diego State || Unknown • San Diego, California || 6–4 || 21–6 || 4–1
|- align="center" bgcolor="#ffcccc"
| 28 || April 11 || at San Diego State || Unknown • San Diego, California || 4–8 || 21–7 || 4–2
|- align="center" bgcolor="#ccffcc"
| 29 || April 14 || at San Jose State || Unknown • San Jose, California || 6–0 || 22–7 || 4–2
|- align="center" bgcolor="#ccffcc"
| 30 || April 14 || at San Jose State || Unknown • San Jose, California || 1–0 || 23–7 || 4–2
|- align="center" bgcolor="#ccffcc"
| 31 || April 17 ||  || John Euless Ballpark • Fresno, California || 8–2 || 24–7 || 5–2
|- align="center" bgcolor="#ffcccc"
| 32 || April 17 || Cal Poly || John Euless Ballpark • Fresno, California || 15–18 || 24–8 || 5–3
|- align="center" bgcolor="#ccffcc"
| 33 || April 20 || San Jose State || John Euless Ballpark • Fresno, California || 11–8 || 25–8 || 5–3
|- align="center" bgcolor="#ccffcc"
| 34 || April 20 || San Jose State || John Euless Ballpark • Fresno, California || 13–7 || 26–8 || 5–3
|- align="center" bgcolor="#ccffcc"
| 35 || April 24 || at Cal Poly || Unknown • San Luis Obispo, California || 23–1 || 27–8 || 6–3
|-

|-
! bgcolor="#DDDDFF" width="3%" | #
! bgcolor="#DDDDFF" width="7%" | Date
! bgcolor="#DDDDFF" width="14%" | Opponent
! bgcolor="#DDDDFF" width="25%" | Site/Stadium
! bgcolor="#DDDDFF" width="5%" | Score
! bgcolor="#DDDDFF" width="5%" | Overall Record
! bgcolor="#DDDDFF" width="5%" | CCAA Record
|- align="center" bgcolor="#ccffcc"
| 36 || May 1 ||  || John Euless Ballpark • Fresno, California || 6–4 || 28–8 || 7–3
|- align="center" bgcolor="#ccffcc"
| 37 || May 2 ||  || John Euless Ballpark • Fresno, California || 10–1 || 29–8 || 8–3
|- align="center" bgcolor="#ccffcc"
| 38 || May 2 || Cal State Los Angeles || John Euless Ballpark • Fresno, California || 6–1 || 30–8 || 9–3
|- align="center" bgcolor="#ccffcc"
| 39 || May 5 || Sacramento State || John Euless Ballpark • Fresno, California || 9–5 || 31–8 || 9–3
|- align="center" bgcolor="#ccffcc"
| 40 || May 5 || Sacramento State || John Euless Ballpark • Fresno, California || 8–4 || 32–8 || 9–3
|- align="center" bgcolor="#ccffcc"
| 41 || May 8 || at Cal State Los Angeles || Unknown • Los Angeles, California || 2–1 || 33–8 || 10–3
|- align="center" bgcolor="#ffcccc"
| 42 || May 9 || at UC Santa Barbara || Unknown • Santa Barbara, California || 4–11 || 34–9 || 10–4
|- align="center" bgcolor="#ccffcc"
| 43 || May 9 || at UC Santa Barbara || Unknown • Santa Barbara, California || 13–9 || 35–9 || 11–4
|-

|-
! style="" | Postseason
|-

|-
! bgcolor="#DDDDFF" width="3%" | #
! bgcolor="#DDDDFF" width="7%" | Date
! bgcolor="#DDDDFF" width="14%" | Opponent
! bgcolor="#DDDDFF" width="25%" | Site/Stadium
! bgcolor="#DDDDFF" width="5%" | Score
! bgcolor="#DDDDFF" width="5%" | Overall Record
! bgcolor="#DDDDFF" width="5%" | CCAA Record
|- align="center" bgcolor="#ccffcc"
| 45 || May  ||  || John Euless Ballpark • Fresno, California || 23–11 || – || 11–4
|- align="center" bgcolor="#ccffcc"
| 46 || May  || Santa Clara || John Euless Ballpark • Fresno, California || 15–3 || – || 11–4
|- align="center" bgcolor="#ccffcc"
| 47 || May  || at  || Old Graves Field • Seattle, Washington || 3–2 || – || 11–4
|- align="center" bgcolor="#ffcccc"
| 48 || May  || at Washington || Old Graves Field • Seattle, Washington || 4–5 || – || 11–4
|- align="center" bgcolor="#ccffcc"
| 49 || May  || at Washington || Old Graves Field • Seattle, Washington || 10–5 || – || 11–4
|-

|-
! bgcolor="#DDDDFF" width="3%" | #
! bgcolor="#DDDDFF" width="7%" | Date
! bgcolor="#DDDDFF" width="14%" | Opponent
! bgcolor="#DDDDFF" width="25%" | Site/Stadium
! bgcolor="#DDDDFF" width="5%" | Score
! bgcolor="#DDDDFF" width="5%" | Overall Record
! bgcolor="#DDDDFF" width="5%" | CCAA Record
|- align="center" bgcolor="#ccffcc"
| 50 || June 13 || vs Colorado State College || Omaha Municipal Stadium • Omaha, Nebraska || 6–5 || 39–11 || 11–4
|- align="center" bgcolor="#ffcccc"
| 51 || June 14 || vs Arizona || Omaha Municipal Stadium • Omaha, Nebraska || 1–5 || 39–12 || 11–4
|- align="center" bgcolor="#ccffcc"
| 52 || June 15 || vs Western Michigan || Omaha Municipal Stadium • Omaha, Nebraska || 7–2 || 40–12 || 11–4
|- align="center" bgcolor="#ccffcc"
| 53 || June 16 || vs Arizona || Omaha Municipal Stadium • Omaha, Nebraska || 2–0 || 41–12 || 11–4
|- align="center" bgcolor="#ffcccc"
| 54 || June 16 || vs Oklahoma State || Omaha Municipal Stadium • Omaha, Nebraska || 0–4 || 41–13 || 11–4
|-

|-
|

Awards and honors
Augie Garrido
First Team All-District VIII

Lee Gregory
First Team All-CCAA
First Team All-District VIII

Jim Lester
First Team All-CCAA

Mike Mathiesen
First Team All-CCAA

Jerry White
First Team All-CCAA

References

Fresno State Bulldogs baseball seasons
Fresno State Bulldogs baseball
College World Series seasons
Fresno State
California Collegiate Athletic Association baseball champion seasons